State Highway 144 (SH 144) is a  long state highway in northeastern Colorado. SH 144's western terminus is at Interstate 76 (I-76) west of Wiggins, and the eastern terminus is at SH 52 in Fort Morgan.

Route description

SH 144 begins in the west at I-76 and proceeds initially to the north; after , the road crosses U.S. Route 34 (US 34). After another , the route crosses the South Platte River and begins to curve in a broad arc to the east roughly following a meander of the South Platte.  Continuing now in a generally westward direction, SH 144 meets the north end of SH 39 at Goodrich. The road then continues its arc westward and eventually WSW through Weldona, again across the South Platte River, and through Log Lane Village. Now traveling in approximately a southwesterly direction, SH 144 crosses to the south side of I-76 and continues for a further  to its eastern terminus at SH 52 in Fort Morgan.

Major intersections

References

External links

144
Transportation in Morgan County, Colorado
Fort Morgan, Colorado